Albert Viktorovich Shchukin (born 11 April 1971) is a Russian football coach and a former player.

References

1971 births
Living people
Soviet footballers
Russian footballers
FC Lokomotiv Nizhny Novgorod players
Russian expatriate footballers
Expatriate footballers in Libya
FC Sibir Novosibirsk players
FC Chernomorets Novorossiysk players
Russian Premier League players
Association football goalkeepers
FC Dynamo Vologda players